The 1927 Washington & Jefferson Presidents football team was an American football team that represented Washington & Jefferson College as an independent during the 1927 college football season. The team compiled a 7–0–2 record. Andrew Kerr was the head coach.

Schedule

References

Washington and Jefferson
Washington & Jefferson Presidents football seasons
College football undefeated seasons
Washington and Jefferson Presidents football